Betelhem Moges (born 3 May 1991) is an Ethiopian long-distance runner competing in marathon and half marathon events.

Career 

In 2012, she won the Ústí nad Labem Half Marathon held in Ústí nad Labem, Czech Republic with a time of 1:11:51.

In 2013, she won the Olomouc Half Marathon held in Olomouc, Czech Republic with a time of 1:10:38.

In 2014, she won the České Budějovice Half Marathon held in České Budějovice, Czech Republic with a time of 1:12:31. In this year, she also won a marathon event for the first time: the Amsterdam Marathon held in Amsterdam, Netherlands with a time of 2:28:35.

In 2015, she won the Beijing Marathon held in Beijing, China with a time of 2:27:31.

In 2017, she won the Cape Town Marathon held in Cape Town, South Africa with a time of 2:30:22.

In 2019, she finished in 2nd place in the marathon event of the Ottawa Race Weekend held in Ottawa, Ontario, Canada.

Achievements

References

External links 

 

Living people
1991 births
Place of birth missing (living people)
Ethiopian female long-distance runners
Ethiopian female marathon runners
21st-century Ethiopian women